For more detailed character information, see List of Monk characters.
Below is a list of actors and actresses that were part of the cast of the American comedy-drama television series Monk. 

The show's main stars included, at some point, Tony Shalhoub, Bitty Schram, Traylor Howard, Ted Levine, and Jason Gray-Stanford.  Stanley Kamel, Kane Ritchotte, and Stellina Rusich were credited as starring in the pilot episode, while Brooke Adams was credited as starring in "Mr. Monk and the Airplane".

Cast 
  = Starring 
  = Recurring/Guest 
  = Archive footage or voiceovers

External links 
 Full cast and crew of Monk on the Internet Movie Database

Cast members 
Lists of actors by comedy television series